Villa Manifesto is the sixth studio album by Detroit hip hop group Slum Village. It was released on July 27, 2010, via E1 Records.

Background
Villa Manifesto serves as both a reunion and a memorial album.  Two late founding members of the group (Baatin and J Dilla) appeared posthumously as main artists of the album alongside T3 and Elzhi.  Illa J, J Dilla's younger brother, is also featured on the album, as well as production from Young RJ, making it the first Slum Village LP to feature all six members.  Founding member T3 stated: "I wanted to pull the whole squad together. The reason why we call it Villa Manifesto is that it was a statement we want to give our people because we had been away for so long. What we're doing, what's going on, how we're feeling and where we're at today." Before the album's release, T3 stated on Twitter that it was their final studio album. However, in a subsequent interview with Billboard, he clarified: "If this album does phenomenal and the supporters just overwhelm me, I wouldn't have a choice but to do another record -- and I believe this record could be phenomenal for us."

Music
Baatin, who has reunited with the group in 2008 prior to his death the year after, has worked on nearly twenty songs, and unreleased vocals from J Dilla are featured on four songs. Guest appearances includes De La Soul, Little Brother, Colin Munroe, Dwele and Phife Dawg. A bulk of production was handled by Young RJ. The album also features productions by Mr. Porter, Dave West, Khrysis, Hi-Tek, T3, A&R DJ Scrap Dirty Violator Djs and unreleased production from J Dilla.

Singles
"Faster" has been confirmed as the first single, featuring Canadian singer Colin Munroe, and was released on June 1, 2010. A video for the song was made and released on July 12, 2010.

Track listing

Sample Credits
”Lock It Down” uses a previously unreleased instrumental track by J Dilla
”Scheming” uses previously unreleased vocals performed by J Dilla
”Earl Flinn” samples ”Johnee Jingo” by Todd Rundgren.
”2000 Beyond” samples “Funky Drummer” by James Brown
”2000 Beyond” also uses previously unreleased vocals performed by J Dilla
”We'll Show You” uses a previously unreleased basic instrumental track by J Dilla

Personnel
DJ Babu - Scratches (1)
Sam Beaubien - Horn arrangement (1), String arrangement (12)
DJ Dez - Scratches (12)
Vernon D. Hill - Additional Keyboards (13)
Lauren “L. Boogie” Johnson - Percussion (3, 5, 9)
Craig Lane - Keyboards (5, 12, Additional on 3, 6–7, 9)
Michael Mindingall - Additional Keyboards (7)
Colin Munroe - Additional Vocals (Sung by) (5)
Questlove - Live Drums (6)
Vice Verse - Poetry performed by (3)

References

2010 albums
E1 Music albums
Slum Village albums
Albums produced by J Dilla
Albums produced by Mr. Porter
Albums produced by Hi-Tek
Albums produced by Khrysis